Ramchandra Chintaman Dhere (21 July 1930 – 1 July 2016) was a Marathi writer from Maharashtra, India.

Early life
Dhere was born in the small village of Nigade in Pune district. He was orphaned at an early age of five. He studied at Municipal School, Pune, Poona English School, Poona Night School and  graduated in 1966. During high school days he worked as a proof reader in the local press.

Dhere earned a PhD in Marathi in 1975. His doctoral thesis titled Shtsthal: Ek Adhyan was completed under the guidance of Ramchandra Shankar Walimbe. In 1980, he became the first person to obtain a Doctorate of Literature from Pune University.

Career
From his childhood, Dhere was deeply influenced by folk-life and literature. He was drawn towards saint literature such as Warkari and Nath
sects and started studying them.

Dhere wrote over 100 scholarly books, including some edited or translated works of others, on Marathi folk literature and culture, reconstruction of cultural history of places, religious sects in Maharashtra, and biographies of marathi saints. He also composed several poems and musical plays. Dhere lost almost all of his collection of old books in 1961 when the Panshet Dam broke flooding the city of Pune.

Dhere received a Sahitya Akademi Award in 1987 for his literary criticism Shri Vitthal: Ek MahaSamanvay. The highly influential book was translated to English by Anne Feldhaus and published by Oxford University Press in 2011.

Death and legacy
Dhere died in Pune on 1 July 2016 at the age of 86 following prolonged illness. Writer Aruna Ramchandra Dhere is his daughter. In 2019, a library was built in Pune to preserve a collection of his books.

Literary work
The following is a partial list of Dhere's works:

Notes

Marathi-language writers
Recipients of the Sahitya Akademi Award in Marathi
1930 births
People from Pune district
2016 deaths